Chelsea Keolani Hardin (born September 5, 1991) is an American model, public speaker, and beauty pageant titleholder who was crowned Miss Hawaii USA 2016. She was the first runner-up to Deshauna Barber of District of Columbia at Miss USA 2016.

Early life
Hardin was born on September 5, 1991, in Honolulu, Hawaii. She is of Native Hawaiian, Chinese, Filipino, Portuguese, Spanish, Dutch, Irish, English, French, and Scandinavian descent. Her father Kevin Hardin is a Hawaiian Airlines pilot, while her mother Christine Mitchell is a real estate agent. Hardin attended the ʻIolani School and later California Polytechnic State University in San Luis Obispo, California. While a university student, she played NCAA Division I women's volleyball.

Pageantry

Miss Hawaii USA 2016
Hardin represented East Oahu at Miss Hawaii USA 2016 on November 22, 2015, and was crowned the winner by outgoing titleholder Emma Wo.

Miss USA 2016
On June 5, 2016, Hardin competed in the Miss USA 2016 pageant in Las Vegas, Nevada. She went on to place as the first runner-up to winner Deshauna Barber of District of Columbia, despite being the favorite to win.

The pageant garnered some controversy due to the question Hardin was asked by the judges during the final question portion of the pageant, which was if she'd vote for Hillary Clinton or Donald Trump during the 2016 United States presidential election. The question was criticized by numerous members of the media for being invasive, while the live audience booed after hearing what Hardin had been asked.

References

External links

Living people
1991 births
American beauty pageant winners
American people of Native Hawaiian descent
American people of Filipino descent
American people of Portuguese descent
American people of Spanish descent
American people of Dutch descent
American people of Irish descent
American people of English descent
American people of French descent
American people of Scandinavian descent
Miss USA 2016 delegates
ʻIolani School alumni
California Polytechnic State University alumni
People from Honolulu
Hawaii people of Chinese descent
Hawaii people of Portuguese descent